Nickolas Morin-Soucy (born May 13, 1984) is a former professional Canadian football defensive tackle for the Montreal Alouettes of the Canadian Football League. He was drafted by the Alouettes in the third round of the 2009 CFL Draft, signed a three-year contract in May and played during the pre-season of the 2009 Montreal Alouettes season but suffered a torn anterior cruciate ligament injury and the Alouettes announced his retirement on June 24, 2009. His name was then placed on an injury unable to perform list, and was reactivate at mid-season of the 2010 season, when he participated in his first professional game with the Als. He played CIS football for the Montreal Carabins.

References

External links
Montreal Alouettes bio

1984 births
Living people
People from Gaspé, Quebec
Canadian football defensive linemen
Montreal Carabins football players
Montreal Alouettes players
Players of Canadian football from Quebec